Lu Keran (born Lu Jie []; November 7, 1995), is a Chinese singer and dancer. She is a former member of Chinese girl group THE9 after finishing ninth in iQIYI's survival reality program Youth With You 2. She is also the leader of girl group Fanxy Red.

Early life
Keran was born on November 7, 1995 in Nanjing, China. She played competitive fencing for six years, and even went to a special athletic academy to be a competitive fencer.

Filmography

Variety and Reality Shows

Discography

Single albums

Singles

Activities

additional 
The artist has modeled in multiple fashion magazines, including Vanity Teen.

Notes

References

External links

Chinese pop singers
21st-century Chinese women singers
1995 births
Living people
Youth With You contestants
Musicians from Nanjing
THE9 members